The WABA Champions Cup 2011 was the 14th staging of the WABA Champions Cup, the basketball club tournament of West Asia Basketball Association.

Group stage

Group A

Group B

Quarterfinals

Semifinals

Finals

External links
www.asia-basket.com

2011
2010–11 in Asian basketball leagues
2010–11 in Iranian basketball
2010–11 in Lebanese basketball
2010–11 in Jordanian basketball
2011 in Syrian sport
2011 in Iraqi sport
2011 in Yemeni sport